Alpha Serpentis or α Serpentis, formally named Unukalhai, is a double star in the head (Serpens Caput) of the equatorial constellation of Serpens. With an apparent visual magnitude of 2.6, this star is the brightest in the constellation and it can be viewed with the naked eye from most of the Earth.

Properties
Alpha Serpentis is a giant star with a stellar classification of K2IIIbCN1, having consumed the hydrogen at its core and evolved away from the main sequence. It has 1.7 times the mass and 13.5 times the radius of the Sun. The effective temperature of the outer envelope is 4,498 K, giving it an orange hue that is characteristic of a K-type star. It has been classified as a strong CN star, showing a higher than expected strength in the cyanogen bands.

This star is radiating about 38 times the luminosity of the Sun, while a further 32 times the Sun's luminosity is being emitted in the infrared, for 70-fold total. A magnitude +11.8 companion is at an angular separation of 58 arcseconds from Alpha Serpentis, while a 13th magnitude star lies 2.3 arcminutes distant.

Nomenclature
α Serpentis (Latinised to Alpha Serpentis) is the system's Bayer designation.

It bore the traditional names Unukalhai (alternatively spelt Unuk al Hay or Unuk Elhaija) from the Arabic عنق الحيّة  ʽunuq al-ḥayyah "the serpent's neck", and Cor Serpentis from the Latin "the Heart of the Serpent". In 2016, the International Astronomical Union organized a Working Group on Star Names (WGSN) to catalogue and standardize proper names for stars. The WGSN approved the name Unukalhai for this star on 21 August 2016 and it is now so entered in the IAU Catalog of Star Names.

Alpha Serpentis is a member of the indigenous Arabic asterism al-Nasaq al-Yamānī "the Southern Line" of al-Nasaqān "the Two Lines", along with Delta Serpentis, Epsilon Serpentis, Delta Ophiuchi, Epsilon Ophiuchi, Zeta Ophiuchi and Gamma Ophiuchi. According to a 1971 NASA catalogue, al-Nasaq al-Yamānī or Nasak Yamani was the name for two stars: Delta Serpentis as Nasak Yamani I and Epsilon Serpentis as Nasak Yamani II.

References

K-type giants
CN stars
Triple star systems

Serpens (constellation)
Serpentis, Alpha
BD+06 3088
Serpentis, 24
140573
077070
5854
Unukalhai